Music and Friends may refer to:

 Music and Friends (Simani album), 1987
 Music and Friends (Walter Ostanek album), 1994
 Music & Friends (album), a 2014 album by Cafêzz